Here It Comes is the third EP from Doves. It was the last release on the band's Casino Records label on 2 August 1999 on limited CD and 10" vinyl. Martin Rebelski, the unofficial fourth member of Doves, plays piano on the title track. "Here It Comes" also charted on the UK Singles Chart at #73.

Track listing

Notes
 Casino Records CHIP003.
 All songs written, produced, and arranged by Doves.
 "Here It Comes" engineered by Martin Wilding.
 Piano on "Here It Comes" by Martin Rebelski.
 Sleeve design and artwork by Rick Myers.

Charts

References

Doves (band) albums
1999 EPs